Sigurgeirsson may refer to:

Ásgeir Sigurgeirsson (born 1985), Icelandic sport shooter who competes in the men's 10 metre air pistol
Pétur Sigurgeirsson (1919–2010), the Bishop of Iceland from 1981 to 1989
Rúnar Þór Sigurgeirsson (born 1999), Icelandic footballer
Stefan Jon Sigurgeirsson (born 1989), alpine skier from Iceland